Magheramorne is a hamlet in County Antrim, Northern Ireland. It is about 5 miles south of Larne on the shores of Larne Lough. It had a population of 75 people in the 2001 Census. Following the reform of Northern Ireland's local government system on 1 April 2015, Magheramorne lies within the Mid and East Antrim Borough Council area.

Industry

Nearby is an old limestone quarry currently owned by Lafarge (formerly known as Blue Circle). Extraction of limestone from the quarry, for use in the Magheramorne cement plant, ceased in 1980.

The high point for limestone extraction at Magheramorne was in the 19th and 20th centuries. In the 19th century a mission church for labourers at the limeworks was established and became a Presbyterian Church.

In September 2009, Lafarge obtained outline planning permission for redevelopment of the quarry and cement works, including a new eco-friendly village and a major cycling centre mainly in the quarry.

A regeneration plan was proposed to transform the quarry into a nature conservation, leisure and housing area. If the plans go ahead, the 75 hectare quarry is to be home to a World Cycling Centre and the All-Ireland Scuba Diving Centre.  The area of Larne Lough that was used to ship cement out of Magheramorne is now used as a marina.

Game of Thrones
The abandoned Magheramorne quarry area was used as a filming location for the HBO TV series Game of Thrones. Castle Black, Hardhome and The Wall were filmed there, and battlements were built there to serve as King's Landing's defences during the Battle of Blackwater Bay; scenes shot atop the wall were filmed inside the Paint Hall Studios in Belfast.

The composite set (with both exteriors and interiors) consisted of a large section of Castle Black including the courtyard, the ravenry, the mess hall and the barracks, and used the stone wall of the quarry as the basis for the ice wall that protects Westeros. A functional elevator was built to lift the rangers to the top of The Wall.

The area around the elevator was painted white to make it look like ice. George R. R. Martin said: "It's a pretty spectacular, yet miserable location. It is wet and rainy, and the mud is thick. I visited there; it really gets the actors in the mood of being at the end of the world in all of this cold and damp and chill".

People
Saint Comgall, founder of Bangor Abbey in County Down, was born at Magheramorne in the 6th century.
Hugh Nelson (Canadian politician), former Lieutenant Governor of British Columbia, was born at Magheramorne in 1830.

Transport
Magheramorne railway station was opened on 1 October 1862.

Culture

 The area is home to the Magheramorne Silver Band, established in 1882 by a local Orange Lodge. The band originally drew its membership mainly from the Magheramorne area and surrounding district, although this is no longer the case. It continues to undertake a wide range of engagements across East Antrim and further afield. 
Magheramorne is home to many different organisations, including Magheramorne Presbyterian Church and its associated groups for Women and Children. Several Loyal Orders are at home in Magheramorne also.

Sport
 Newington Rangers F.C. play in the Northern Amateur Football League.

References

Sources 
NI Neighbourhood Information Service

External links 

Magheramorne Reinvented

Villages in County Antrim
Surface mines in Northern Ireland